Sarhangabad (also Romanized as Sarhangābād; also known as Sarangābād, Sarhangcheh, and Saringābād) is a village in Sofla Rural District, Zavareh District, Ardestan County, Isfahan Province, Iran. At the 2006 census, its population was 7, in 4 families.

References 

Populated places in Ardestan County